Desert Falcon is a scrolling shooter developed by General Computer Corporation for the Atari 7800 and Atari 2600 and published by Atari Corporation in 1987. It was initially announced in 1984 as one of the planned launch titles for the 7800. A cartridge version for the Atari 8-bit family, with XEGS-styled packaging, followed in 1988.

Designed by Bob Polaro, Desert Falcon is loosely based on ancient Egyptian mythology. The diagonally-scrolling isometric graphics had reviewers comparing it to Sega's Zaxxon from 1982.

Gameplay

Development
The game was revealed in 1984 as part of the Atari 7800 announcement. It was referred to as both Sphinx and Nile Flyer.

Reception
Reviewing the Atari 8-bit version for ANALOG Computing in 1989, Matthew J.W. Ratcliff wrote, "Desert Falcon has good graphics, cute sound effects, and a tired, boring theme." He cited Zaxxon several times, calling Desert Falcon a visually different spin on the same gameplay. New Atari User wrote, "The scrolling in Desert Falcon isn't quite as smooth as it could be," but complimented the animation of the falcon and the use of shadows. In Antic, David Plotkin wrote, "The manual describes a wide variety of enemies. Unfortunately, except for some flying triangles, they all looked pretty much alike". He still concluded with "It has excellent graphics and is very playable."

After playing the 7800 cartridge, Len Poggiali of Current Notes described it as "an average arcade game with a below average plot and above average visual appeal."

References

External links
Desert Falcon for the Atari 2600 at Atari Mania
Desert Falcon for the Atari 8-bit family at Atari Mania
Review of the 7800 version from GamePro issue 1
Review in Power Play (German)

1987 video games
Atari 2600 games
Atari 7800 games
Atari 8-bit family games
Video games with isometric graphics
Scrolling shooters
Video games about birds
Video games based on Egyptian mythology
Video games developed in the United States
Video games set in Egypt